Nova Bukovica is a village and municipality in Croatia in the Virovitica–Podravina County. It has a population of 1,771 (2011 census), 85% of which are Croats.

References

External links

Municipalities of Croatia
Populated places in Virovitica-Podravina County